This article contains an incomplete list of persons who have served on the Board of County Commissioners of Orange County, North Carolina. The Board of Commissioners is composed of seven members serving staggered terms of four years. Commissioners are elected by district and at-large in partisan elections. (Board membership increased from three members to five members in 1954 and from five members to seven members in 2008.)

Current commissioners
Jamezetta Bedford (2018- )
Mark Dorosin (2012- )
Amy Fowler (2020- )
Sally Greene (2018- )
Jean Hamilton (2020- )
Earl McKee (2010- )
Renee Price (2012- )

Former commissioners

John H. Hanner (1932–1938)
W. P. Berry (1932–1936)
J C. Lloyd (1932–1936)
Carl T. Durham (1936–1938)
S. A. Nathan (1936–1938)
Collier Cobb (1938–1952)
J. Ed Laws (1938–1942)
Ben Wilson (1938–1950)
Sim Efland (1950–1956)
Hubert G. Laws (1942–1951)
R. O. Forrest (1951–1954)
R. J. M. Hobbs (1952–1960)
Henry S. Walker (1954–1974)
Dwight M. Ray (1954–1958)
Edwin S. Lanier (1954–1956)
Donald Stanford (1956–1964)
Claude T. Pope (1956–1957)
Donald McDade (1957–1962)
Clarence Jones (1958–1962)
Harvey D. Bennett (1960–1972)
Gordon Cleveland (1962–1966)
Carl M. Smith (1962–1970)
William C. Ray (1964–1972)
Ira A. Ward (1966–1973)
C. Norman Walker (1970–1986)
Flora R. Garrett (1972–1976)
Richard E. Whitted (1972–1984)
Melvin Whitfield (1973–1974)
Norman F. Gustaveson (1974–1982)
Jan Pinney (1974–1978)
Donald (Don) Willhoit (1976–1996)
Anne C. Barnes (1978–1981)
Shirley E. Marshall (1981–1990)
Andrew B. (Ben) Lloyd, Jr. (1982–1986)
John W. Hartwell (1986–1990)
Verla C. Insko (1990–1994)
William (Bill) L. Crowther (1994–1998)
Margaret W. Brown (1996–2004)
Stephen Halkiotis (1986–2006)
Moses Carey, Jr. (1984–2008)
Mike Nelson (2006-2010)
Valerie P. Foushee (2004–2012)
Pam Hemminger (2008–2012)
Steve Yuhasz (2008–2012)
Alice Gordon (1990–2014)
Bernadette Pelissier (2008-2016)
Barry Jacobs (1998-2018)
Mia Burroughs (2014-2018)
Penny Rich (2012-2020)
Mark Marcoplos (2016-2020)

External links
 Oral History Interviews with Anne C. Barnes at Oral Histories of the American South